Granuloma gluteale infantum is a cutaneous condition that appears in the anogenital region of infants as a complication of diaper dermatitis.

According to some, no granulomas are found.

See also 
 Superficial granulomatous pyoderma
 List of cutaneous conditions

References

External links 

Mycosis-related cutaneous conditions